Euclea incisa is a species of slug caterpillar moth in the family Limacodidae.

References

Further reading

 

Limacodidae
Articles created by Qbugbot
Moths described in 1876